Phil Grabsky is a BAFTA-winning British documentary filmmaker who has received multiple awards for his directing, writing, producing and cinematography. 

He and his company Seventh Art Productions are behind cinema films such as Muhammad Ali – Through the Eyes of the World, In Search of Beethoven, In Search of Mozart and the landmark My Childhood, My Country – 20 Years in Afghanistan, which won Best Single Documentary at the 2022 Television BAFTAs and was also nominated for its cinematography. He has made over 250 films which have played in cinemas and on TV and digital platforms worldwide. 

Among the many films Grabsky has directed for television are multiple singles for Channel 4, ITV, the BBC, Discovery, A&E, PBS, Sky Arts and others, as well as major series such as I Caesar – the Rise and Fall of the Roman Empire, The Great Commanders, Tim Marlow on… and Spain – In the Shadow of the Sun. Seventh Art has also made six history films with Monty Python’s Terry Jones, alongside being the world’s biggest producer of arts film for cinema and TV over the last 20 years.

Phil Grabsky also made the first surround-sound documentary The Lost Temple of Java for the BBC and the world’s first 3D visual arts film, Tim Marlow on British Sculpture at the Royal Academy of Arts for Sky Arts 3D. 

Grabsky's Great Composers series includes the four In Search Of films, each exploring the life and music of a different classical composer (Beethoven, Mozart, Haydn and Chopin), as well as the ground-breaking feature Concerto – A Beethoven Journey following world-famous pianist Leif Ove Andsnes on his extensive journey through the five Beethoven piano concertos. In Search of Mozart premiered at London's Barbican concert hall in 2006, in front of 1000 people.

In 2007 Grabsky completed Escape from Luanda which tells the tale of three students at Angola's only music school. Other films cover a broad range of topics, from Brazilian footballer Pele and Muhammad Ali to Heavy Water: A Film for Chernobyl (2006), which explores the Chernobyl nuclear disaster through Mario Petrucci’s poetry. He worked in conjunction with director David Bickerstaff for this project which won Best Short Documentary at the Cinequest Film Festival.

Grabsky has also written four history books, including The Great Artists – co-authored with Tim Marlow – and the best-seller The Great Commanders. He is regularly involved as a judge for the Emmys, BAFTAs, Grierson and One World awards, and has won numerous personal awards himself including Royal Television Society awards for both ‘Best Director’ and ‘Services to Television’, and a Voice of the Listener and Viewer Award for ‘Services to Education.’

Grabsky also lectures and gives masterclasses and has been invited to talk on Radio 3 (In Tune), Radio 4 (the Today Show, Start the Week, The History Quiz), Radio 5, BBC Southern Counties (Breakfast show, Film Review, Music of my Life), Classic FM, LBC, TalkSport, Times Radio, and the BBC World Service.  He also frequently attends question & answer sessions with his films in the UK and around the world. He also has an art blog and hosts the popular podcast ‘Painting of the Week.’

In 2009, Grabsky and his colleagues began work on a new arts genre for the cinema: Exhibition on Screen, which began with 'Leonardo Live'. This brings major art exhibitions – and the intimate biographies of the artists – to cinema, mainstream television and home entertainment platforms worldwide. The aim of the project is to increase access to these exhibitions and their curatorial context. Grabsky has said of them that they are 'partly for people to learn about the works and partly the pure aesthetic pleasure of seeing the artworks on a massive screen'. Exhibition on Screen now plays in 1500 cinemas and 60+ countries worldwide. Its website lists 34 films on artists including Leonardo da Vinci, Vincent van Gogh, Rembrandt, David Hockney, Frida Kahlo, and Vermeer.

Feature documentaries
 Pissarro: Father of Impressionism (2022)
 My Childhood, My Country - 20 Years in Afghanistan (2021)
 The Danish Collector: Delacroix to Gaugin (2021)
 Sunflowers (2021)
 Easter in Art (2020)
 Frida Kahlo (2020)
 Raphael Revealed (2020)
 Lucian Freud: A Self Portrait (2020)
 Leonardo: The Works (2019)
 Van Gogh and Japan (2019)
 Young Picasso (2019)
 Degas: Passion For Perfection (2018)
 David Hockney at the Royal Academy of Arts (2017)
 Michelangelo: Love and Death (2017)
 The Artist's Garden: American Impressionism (2017)
 I, Claude Monet (2017)
 Canaletto and the Art of Venice (2017)
 The Curious World of Hieronymus Bosch (2016)
 Painting the Modern Garden: from Monet to Matisse (2016)
 Concerto - A Beethoven Journey (2015)
 Renoir: Revered and Reviled (2015)
 Goya: Visions of Flesh and Blood (2015)
 The impressionists and the Man Who Made Them (2015)
 Vincent van Gogh: a New Way of Seeing (2015)
 Girl with a Pearl Earring (2015)
 Matisse Live (2014)
 In Search of Chopin (2014)
 Rembrandt from the National Gallery (2014)
 Leonardo from the National Gallery (2014)
 Vermeer (2013)
 Munch (2013)
 Manet (2012)
 Leonardo Live (2012)
 In Search of Haydn (2012)
 The Boy Mir - Ten Years in Afghanistan (2011)
 In Search of Beethoven (2009)
 Escape from Luanda (2007)
 Heavy Water: A Film for Chernoby (2006)
 In Search of Mozart (2006)
 The Boy who Plays on the Buddhas of Bamiyan (2003)
 Muhammad Ali – Through the Eyes of the World (2001)

Selected TV programmes

Series

Great Art (2018–present)
Judgement Day: Images of Heaven and Hell (2004)
Great Artists with Tim Marlow (2003)
The Impressionists (1998)
I, Caesar – The Rise and Fall of the Roman Empire (1997)
Ancient Warriors (1994-1995)
The Great Commanders (1993)
Spain – In the Shadow of the Sun (1990)

One-offs

Witness - A Child of Afghanistan: 20 Years of War (2021) 45 minute version of My Childhood, My Country: 20 Years in Afghanistan co-directed with Shoaib Sharifi 
Tim Marlow On..Highlights of the New Tate Modern (2006)
The Hidden History of Rome – with Terry Jones (2001)
The Hidden History of Egypt – with Terry Jones (2001)
Brazil – An Inconvenient History (2000)
The Lost Temple of Java (1999)

Publications
The Great Artists: From Giotto to Turner by Grabsky and Tim Marlow (2002)
The Lost Temple of Java by Grabsky (1999)
I, Caesar: Ruling the Roman Empire by Grabsky (1997)
The Great Commanders: Alexander, Caesar, Nelson, Napoleon, Grant and Zhukov by Grabsky (1995)

Awards
My Childhood, My Country - 20 Years in Afghanistan (2021)Best Single Documentary - BAFTA Television Awards (2022)
Best Documentary - Royal Television Society (2022)
Phoenix Award for Best Documentary - Film Festival Cologne (2021)
Best Documentary - Seminici Valladolid International Film Festival (2021)
Golden Reel for Best Documentary - Tiburon Film Festival (2021)
Best International Documentary - DC International Film Festival (2022)
Student Jury Award - One World International Human Rights Film Festival (2022)
Best Documentary Feature - San Luis Obispo International Film Festival (2022)
Best Feature Documentary - Titan International Film Festival (2022)
Best Feature Documentary - Bali International Film Festival (2022)
Author's Documentary - URTO Grand Prix European Film Festival(2022)The Boy Mir - 10 Years in Afghanistan (2011)Best Documentary - Santa Barbara International Film Festival
Best Foreign Film - HumanDOC Documentary Film Festival, Poland
Runner up: long documentary - Al Jazeera International Documentary Film FestivalIn Search of Beethoven (2009) – Shortlisted: Creative communication - Royal Philharmonic Society Music AwardsEscape from Luanda (2007) – Silver Award for Excellence - Park City Film Music FestivalIn Search of Mozart (2006) – Best Documentary - Dubrovnik Film FestivalHeavy Water: A Film for Chernobyl (2006) – Winner – Special Mention - Ourense International Independent Film FestivalThe Boy who Plays on the Buddhas of Bamiyan (2003)''
Best Film, Cinematography and Editing - Gold Hugo in Chicago
First prize - Valladolid International Film Festival
Best Original Score (Dimitri Tchamouroff) – RTS Awards

References

External links 

Escape from Luanda
escapefromluanda.com downloads

Year of birth missing (living people)
Living people
British documentary filmmakers